Basketball Belgium is the governing body of basketball in Belgium. It was founded in 1933, and they became members of FIBA the same year. They are headquartered in Brussels.

Basketball Belgium operates the Belgium men's national team and Belgium women's national team. They organise national competitions in Belgium, for both the men's and women's senior teams, and also the youth national basketball teams.

The top professional league in Belgium is the BNXT League.

See also
Belgium men's national basketball team
Belgium men's national under-20 basketball team
Belgium men's national under-18 basketball team
Belgium men's national under-16 basketball team
Belgium men's national 3x3 team
Belgium women's national basketball team
Belgium women's national under-20 basketball team
Belgium women's national under-19 basketball team
Belgium women's national under-17 basketball team
Belgium women's national 3x3 team

References

External links
Official website 
Belgium FIBA profile

Basketball
Fed
Basketball governing bodies in Europe
Sports organizations established in 1933